Eleutherodactylus tonyi is a species of frog in the family Eleutherodactylidae endemic to Cuba.
Its natural habitats are subtropical or tropical moist lowland forest, rocky areas, and caves. It is threatened by habitat loss.

References

tonyi
Endemic fauna of Cuba
Amphibians of Cuba
Amphibians described in 1997
Taxonomy articles created by Polbot